Mykhaylo Denysov (born 3 October 1985) is a Ukrainian football player who plays for Uzbek League side FC Navbahor Namangan.

External links

 Profile

1985 births
Living people
Ukrainian footballers
Ukrainian expatriate footballers
Expatriate footballers in Hungary
Expatriate footballers in Azerbaijan
Expatriate footballers in Uzbekistan
Fehérvár FC players
FC Zirka Kropyvnytskyi players

Association football defenders